The spider genus Aname is endemic to Australia, with one species (Aname tasmanica) found only on Tasmania. It contains the black wishbone spider, A. atra.

Spiders in this genus, together with the related and very similar genera Chenistonia and Namea, are called "wishbone spiders", for the shape of their open silk-lined burrow, which has the shape of the letter "Y", with one arm shorter than the other. Only the longer arm reaches the surface. The shorter arm is believed to allow the spider to survive flooding by trapping an air bubble.

While Aname prefers dry open country and occurs throughout much of Australia (though mostly inland), Chenistonia occurs mostly in south and western Australia, and Namea is only known along the east coasts in rain forests.

The lesser wishbone spider (A. distincta) occurs through lowland open forests of the Moreton Valley as far north as Eidsvold and Gayndah, the greater wishbone spider A. pallida from Gladstone along the dry coastal corridors to Cairns.

Bites from Aname are rare, but females of A. inimica (also called "unfriendly" by Aborigines) are reported to have bitten several people, resulting in local pain, redness and soreness.

Species
, the World Spider Catalog accepts the 48 species:
 A. aragog Harvey, Framenau, Wojcieszek, Rix & Harvey, 2012 — Australia (Western Australia)
 A. atra (Strand, 1913) — Australia (South Australia)
 A. aurea Rainbow & Pulleine, 1918 — Australia (New South Wales)
 A. baileyorum Castalanelli, Framenau, Huey, Hillyer & Harvey, 2020 — Australia (Western Australia)
 A. barrema Raven, 1985 — Australia (Queensland)
 A. blackdownensis Raven, 1985 — Australia (Queensland)
 A. camara Raven, 1985 — Australia (Queensland)
 A. carina Raven, 1985 — Australia (Queensland)
 A. coenosa Rainbow & Pulleine, 1918 — Australia (South Australia)
 A. collinsorum Raven, 1985 — Australia (Queensland)
 A. comosa Rainbow & Pulleine, 1918 — Australia (South Australia)
 A. distincta (Rainbow, 1914) — Australia (Queensland)
 A. diversicolor (Hogg, 1902) — Australia (Queensland)
 A. elegans (Harvey, Wilson & Rix, 2022) — Australia (South Australia)
 A. ellenae Harvey, Framenau, Wojcieszek, Rix & Harvey, 2012 — Australia (Western Australia)
 A. exulans Harvey & Huey, 2020 — Australia (Western Australia)
 A. frostorum Castalanelli, Framenau, Huey, Hillyer & Harvey, 2020 — Australia (Western Australia)
 A. fuscocincta Rainbow & Pulleine, 1918 — Australia (Western Australia)
 A. grandis Rainbow & Pulleine, 1918 — Australia (South Australia)
 A. grothi Castalanelli, Framenau, Huey, Hillyer & Harvey, 2020 — Australia (Western Australia)
 A. hirsuta Rainbow & Pulleine, 1918 — Australia (South Australia)
 A. humptydoo Raven, 1985 — Australia (Northern Territory)
 A. inimica Raven, 1985 — Australia (Queensland, New South Wales)
 A. kirrama Raven, 1984 — Australia (Queensland)
 A. lillianae Harvey & Huey, 2020 — Australia (Western Australia)
 A. longitheca Raven, 1985 — Australia (Queensland)
 A. lorica Castalanelli, Framenau, Huey, Hillyer & Harvey, 2020 — Australia (Western Australia)
 A. maculata (Rainbow & Pulleine, 1918) — Australia (Western Australia)
 A. mainae Raven, 2000 — Australia (South Australia)
 A. marae Harvey, Framenau, Wojcieszek, Rix & Harvey, 2012 — Australia (Western Australia)
 A. mcalpinei Castalanelli, Framenau, Huey, Hillyer & Harvey, 2020 — Australia (Western Australia)
 A. mccleeryorum Harvey & Huey, 2020 — Australia (Western Australia)
 A. mellosa Harvey, Framenau, Wojcieszek, Rix & Harvey, 2012 — Australia (Western Australia)
 A. munyardae Castalanelli, Framenau, Huey, Hillyer & Harvey, 2020 — Australia (Western Australia)
 A. nitidimarina Castalanelli, Framenau, Huey, Hillyer & Harvey, 2020 — Australia (Western Australia)
 A. pallida L. Koch, 1873 (type) — Australia (Queensland)
 A. phillipae Harvey & Huey, 2020 — Australia (Western Australia)
 A. platypus (L. Koch, 1875) — Australia
 A. pulchella (Harvey, Wilson & Rix, 2022) — Australia (Western Australia)
 A. robertsorum Raven, 1985 — Australia (Queensland)
 A. simoneae Harvey & Huey, 2020 — Australia (Western Australia)
 A. sinuata Castalanelli, Framenau, Huey, Hillyer & Harvey, 2020 — Australia (Western Australia)
 A. tasmanica Hogg, 1902 — Australia (Tasmania)
 A. tigrina Raven, 1985 — Australia (Queensland)
 A. vernonorum Castalanelli, Framenau, Huey, Hillyer & Harvey, 2020 — Australia (Western Australia)
 A. warialda Raven, 1985 — Australia (Queensland, New South Wales)
 A. watsoni Castalanelli, Framenau, Huey, Hillyer & Harvey, 2020 — Australia (Western Australia)
 A. whitei Castalanelli, Framenau, Huey, Hillyer & Harvey, 2020 — Australia (Western Australia)

References

Anamidae
Spiders of Australia
Mygalomorphae genera